The government of Ricardo Rosselló Nevares  was formed in the weeks following the 2016 Puerto Rico gubernatorial election and ended prematurely on the first week of August 2019.

This government has the distinction of being the only constitutional government in Puerto Rico that ended before its four-year term expired, as Rosselló Nevares resigned on 2 August 2019 as a result of the massive protests stemming from the Telegramgate scandal. There was a period of five days between 2 August and 7 August 2019 where the designated Secretary of State Pedro R. Pierluisi Urrutia acted as governor, but the Puerto Rico Supreme Court vacated the office from after determining he was an invalid occupant and determined his actions during the period were null and void.

This led to the new government of Wanda Vázquez Garced as the 13th Constitutional Governor of Puerto Rico, along with her own cabinet.

Party breakdown 
Party breakdown of cabinet members, not including the governor:

The cabinet was composed of members of the PNP and at the highest point, three concurrent independents or technical positions (or people whose membership in a party was not clearly ascertained from any available media).

Members of the Cabinet 
The Puerto Rican Cabinet is led by the Governor, along with, starting in 1986., the Secretary of Governance. The Cabinet is composed of all members of the Constitutional Council of Secretaries, who are the heads of the  executive departments, along with other Cabinet-level officers who report directly to the Governor of Puerto Rico or to the Secretary of Governance, but who are not heads nor members of  an executive office. All the Cabinet-level officers are at the same bureaucratic level as of the Secretaries

Succession controversy 
While the Secretary of State, Luis G. Rivera Marín, would have been the successor to Rosselló Nevares, his involvement in the Telegramgate scandal forced his resignation earlier in July 2019. Rosselló Nevares attempted to name a successor in Pedro Pierluisi Urrutia by nominating him for the Secretary of State, but his confirmation was stalled in the 18th Legislative Assembly of Puerto Rico, specifically, the Senate.

The situation led to confusion as Rosselló resigned without a confirmed Secretary of State, who at the same time swore in on his own ceremony, becoming de facto governor. After less than a week, the Supreme Court of Puerto Rico decided in  that the clear successor was the Secretary of Justice of Puerto Rico, annulled any recognition or vestiges of legitimacy in the week-long Pierluisi government.

Pierluisi vacated the Palace of Santa Catalina at noon of 7 August 2019, and Wanda Vázquez Garced was sworn that day at 5pm as the 13th Constitutional Governor of Puerto Rico. Her New Progressive Party (PNP) had majorities on both chambers of the 18th Legislative Assembly of Puerto Rico and she inherited several cabinet members from the previous government.

Notes

References 

Government of Puerto Rico
Governors of Puerto Rico
Members of the Cabinet of Puerto Rico by session
Cabinet of Puerto Rico